Bernard René Giraudeau (18 June 1947 – 17 July 2010) was a French sailor, actor, film director, scriptwriter, producer and writer.

Early life
He was born on 18 June 1947 in La Rochelle, Charente-Maritime. In 1963 he enlisted in the French navy as a trainee engineer, qualifying as the first in his class a year later.  He served on the helicopter carrier Jeanne d'Arc in 1964–1965 and 1965–1966, and subsequently on the frigate Duquesne and the aircraft carrier Clemenceau before leaving the navy to try his luck as an actor.

Career
Giraudeau first appeared on film in Deux hommes dans la ville (1973), and his first film as director was in 1987, though he continued to work as an actor.  As a writer, wrote the text of books of photography as well as publishing children's stories (Contes d'Humahuaca, 2002) and several novels.  He was also the reader on the French audiobooks of the Harry Potter series. He has also created a recording of The Little Prince, a world renowned book by Antoine de Saint-Exupéry.

Personal life
He was married to actress and author Anny Duperey, with whom he had two children; one of them, Sara Giraudeau, has achieved success as an actress.

Death
In 2000 he suffered from cancer which led to the removal of his left kidney, with a subsequent metastasis in 2005 affecting his lungs.  He said that the cancer led him to re-evaluate his life and understand himself better. He devoted some of his time to the support of cancer victims through the Institut Curie and the Institut Gustave-Roussy in Paris. He died of his cancer on 17 July 2010 in a Paris hospital.

Filmography as film actor

1973: Revolver – Kidnapper
1973: Deux Hommes dans la ville (directed by José Giovanni) – Frédéric Cazeneuve
1975: Le Gitan (directed by José Giovanni) – Mareuil
1976: Jamais plus toujours – Denis
1977: Le Juge Fayard dit Le Shériff – Le juge Davoust
1977: Bilitis (directed by David Hamilton) – Lucas
1977: Moi, fleur bleue – Isidore
1977: Et la tendresse ? Bordel ! – Luc
1979: Le Toubib (directed by Pierre Granier-Deferre) – François
1980: La Boum – Éric Lehman
1981: Viens chez moi, j'habite chez une copine (directed by Patrice Leconte) – Daniel
1981: Passione d'amore (directed by Ettore Scola) – Capitaine Giorgio Bacchetti
1981: Croque la vie (directed by Jean-Charles Tacchella) – Alain
1982:  (directed by Alexandre Arcady) – Pascal Villars
1982: Meurtres à domicile – Max Queryat
1982: Hécate (directed by Daniel Schmid) – Julien Rochelle
1983: Le Ruffian (directed by José Giovanni) – Gérard
1983: Papy fait de la résistance (directed by Jean-Marie Poiré) – Un resistant arrêté
1984:  (directed by Gilles Béhat) – Chet
1984: L'Année des méduses (directed by Christopher Frank) – Romain Kalides
1985: Les Spécialistes (directed by Patrice Leconte) – Paul Brandon
1985:  (directed by Gérard Vergez) – Delancourt
1985: Moi vouloir toi – L'ex-ami d'alice
1985: Among Wolves – L'exécuteur de De Saintes (uncredited)
1986: Les Longs Manteaux – Murat
1986:  – Inspector Simon Blount
1987: L'homme voilé – Pierre
1987: Vent de panique – Roland Pochon
1991: La Reine blanche (directed by Jean-Loup Hubert) – Yvon
1991: Le coup suprême – Jacques Mercier
1992: Après l'amour (directed by Diane Kurys) – David
1992: Drôles d'oiseaux (directed by Peter Kassovitz) – Constant Van Loo
1993: Une nouvelle vie (directed by Olivier Assayas) – Constantin
1994: Elles ne pensent qu'à ça... (directed by Charlotte Dubreuil) – l'homme de la fin
1994: Le Fils préféré (directed by Nicole Garcia) – Francis
1996: Les Caprices d'un fleuve – Jean-François de La Plaine
1996: Ridicule (directed by Patrice Leconte) – Abbé de Vilecourt
1997: Marianna Ucrìa – Grass
1997: Marquise (directed by Véra Belmont) – Molière
1997: Marthe (directed by Jean-Loup Hubert) – The Colonel
1998: TGV (directed by Moussa Touré) – Roger
1998: Le Double de ma moitié (directed by Yves Amoureux) – Thierry Montino
1999: Gouttes d'eau sur pierres brûlantes (directed by François Ozon) – Léopold
1999: Une affaire de goût (directed by Bernard Rapp) – Frédéric Delamont
2003: That Day – Pointpoirot
2003: La Petite Lili (directed by Claude Miller) – Brice
2003: Les marins perdus – Diamantis
2004: Je suis un assassin – Brice Kantor
2005: Chok-Dee – Jean

Filmography as director
1988 – La Face de l'ogre (film TV)

1991 – L'Autre (film, 1991), d'après le roman d'Andrée Chedid

1992 – Un été glacé (film TV)

1996 – Les Caprices d'un fleuve

Documentaries
1992- The travels of Bernard Giraudeau

1992- La Transamazonienne

1999- Un ami chilien

1999- Chili Norte – Chili Sure

2003 – Esquisses Philippines

Bibliography 
 1992: Transamazonienne, Editions Odyssée, photos Pierre-Jean Rey 
 1996: Les Caprices d'un fleuve, Editions Mille et Une Nuits, 
 2001: Le Marin à l'ancre, Editions Métailié 
 2002: Les Contes d'Humahuaca, Editions Métailié / Seuil jeunesse 
 2003: Ailleurs, commentaire sur les peintures d'Olivier Suire Verley, Editions PC 
 2004: Les Hommes à terre, Editions Métailié 
 2007: Les Dames de nage, Editions Métailié 
 2007: "Le Retour du quartier-maître", in Nos mers et nos océans, collective work of Les Écrivains de marine, Éditions des Équateurs, pp. 75–106

References

External links

1947 births
2010 deaths
Deaths from cancer in France
People from La Rochelle
French male film actors
20th-century French novelists
21st-century French novelists
French children's writers
French National Academy of Dramatic Arts alumni
French film directors
French male screenwriters
French screenwriters
French film producers
20th-century French male actors
21st-century French male actors
French male novelists
20th-century French male writers
21st-century French male writers